Eddie Condon's was the name of three successive jazz venues in New York run by jazz banjoist, guitarist, and bandleader Eddie Condon from 1945 until the mid-1980s. In 1975, Red Balaban took over the management of the club. Ed Polcer was also a part-owner at the time of the club's closing.

The first venue was located on West 3rd Street in Greenwich Village. The club then moved to 52nd Street near Sixth Avenue, the present site of the CBS headquarters building, The final venue was on the south side of East 54th Street, east of Second Avenue.

House bands/musicians
1947-1951: drummer Buzzy Drootin 
1948-1956: pianist Ralph Sutton
1957: pianist Johnny Varro
Cornetist Ed Polcer led the last house band.

Live recordings at Condon's
1954: Ringside at Condon's (Savoy Jazz) - Wild Bill Davison, Eddie Condon, Edmond Hall and others
1955: Midnight at Condon's - Bud Freeman's All Star Orchestra (Mercury/EmArcy)
Jammin' at Condon's - Eddie Condon and His All-Stars (Columbia)
A Night at Eddie Condon's - Eddie Condon and His Orchestra (Decca)
Night at the New Eddie Condon's - Red Balaban & Cats

References 

Jazz clubs in New York City
Music venues in Manhattan
Defunct jazz clubs in New York City
1945 establishments in New York City
1980s disestablishments in New York (state)